And the Wife Shall Revere Her Husband is a 1965 Greek comedy film. The film won the best director award in 1st Chicago International Film Festival.

Plot
Antonis and Eleni are an unmarried couple, which live in a traditional neighbourhood in Athens. Antonis is a literate employee of a ministry but Eleni is an illiterate housewife from a poor family. Due to their social divide between them, Antonis underrates Eleni and treats her like a slave. Nevertheless, she carries on loving him and serving him. But the situation changes after their marriage. Eleni starts to emancipate and she claims equality. Antonis doesn't put up with the new situation and asks divorce. Several years later the two former spouses are met in the demolition of their old house. They remember their old lives and decide to give their relationship even one chance. The film features the characters mixing the humour with emotion and nostalgia, filled also with the beautiful pictures of Athens at those years.

Cast
Maro Kontou - Eleni Kokovikou
Giorgos Konstantinou - Antonis Kokovikos
Despo Diamantidou - Bebeka
Stavros Xenidis - Haralabos
Katerina Gogou - Pagona
Dimitris Kallivokas - Iason Panginaropoulos
Lili Papayanni - Katina
Tasso Kavadia - Aglaia Papamitrou
Nassos Kedrakas - Mikes
Kaiti Lambropoulou - Maro
Despoina Nikolaidou - Klara Panginaropoulou
Nikos Filipopoulos - Themistocles

Awards

References

External links

Greek comedy films
1960s Greek-language films